Asteridea is a genus of flowering plants in the family Asteraceae. Evidence suggests that the genus, Asteridea, is monophyletic.

 Species
Plants of the World Online also lists Asteridea gracilis as accepted, but neither FloraBase nor CHAH accept this species.

References

 
Asteraceae genera
Endemic flora of Australia